Kiddets is a New Zealand-based children's television show which debuted in 2018 and sister series to The WotWots. Created by Martin Baynton and Richard Taylor, the series uses computer animation mixed with live-action clips to follow five alien friends as they learn about life in their playroom. It currently consists of one season and a total of 52 eleven-minute episodes.

Plot 
The show follows five young alien friends called "Kiddets" each with an area of interest and learning; Patches (health, wealth, and safety), Dapper (arts and culture), Bounce (mechanics), Stripes (leadership) and Luna (science). They are space cadets, explorers-in-training at a space academy on planet WotWot. They learn through play in their playroom that overlooks a space port floating above their planet and occasionally reach out for help from SpottyWot and DottyWot on planet Earth.

Production 
Kiddets was created and developed by children's author Martin Baynton in partnership with filmmaker Richard Taylor. Kiddets is co-produced by Pūkeko Pictures and Hengxin Shambala Kids Cultural Industry Development Co., Ltd. (formerly Guangdong Huawen Century Animation Company) and is the first official children's television co-production between New Zealand and China.

The Kiddets characters and their space station are computer-animated with occasional clips from The WotWots over live-action footage by the Weta Workshop, the visual effects company founded by Taylor and Rodger, known for its work on the Lord of the Rings film trilogy.

Broadcast details

References

External links 
 

Animated preschool education television series
2010s preschool education television series
Television series with live action and animation
TVNZ 2 original programming
New Zealand children's television series
2018 New Zealand television series debuts
Computer-animated television series
English-language television shows
Animated television series about children
Animated television series about extraterrestrial life